Moustafa Amer (born 1 September 1967) is an Egyptian swimmer. He competed in three events at the 1988 Summer Olympics.

References

External links
 

1967 births
Living people
Egyptian male swimmers
Olympic swimmers of Egypt
Swimmers at the 1988 Summer Olympics
Place of birth missing (living people)